is a Japanese footballer who currently plays for Albirex Niigata (S).

Career statistics

Club
.

Notes

References

2002 births
Living people
Association football people from Tokyo
Japanese footballers
Japanese expatriate footballers
Association football midfielders
Singapore Premier League players
Avispa Fukuoka players
Albirex Niigata Singapore FC players
Japanese expatriate sportspeople in Singapore
Expatriate footballers in Singapore